Sabrina Mutiara Firdaus Wibowo (born 6 December 1999) is an Indonesian footballer who plays as a defender for Arema Putri and the Indonesia women's national team.

Club career
Sabrina has played for Bali United, Persiba Balikpapan and Arema.

International career
Sabrina represented Indonesia at the 2022 AFC Women's Asian Cup.

References

External links

1999 births
Living people
People from Situbondo Regency
Sportspeople from East Java
Indonesian women's footballers
Women's association football defenders
Indonesia women's international footballers
21st-century Indonesian women